Kevin Elijah Burgess (born July 21, 1988), better known by his stage name KB, is an American Christian hip hop artist and music executive from St. Petersburg, Florida. He is the leader of the hip-hop group HGA. He signed a solo artist contract to Reach Records in 2010. The label has released the Who Is KB? mixtape in 2011, Weight & Glory, on July 17, 2012, the 100 EP on March 4, 2014, Tomorrow We Live on April 21, 2015, and Today We Rebel on October 20, 2017. He is also a member of the label's collective 116 Clique. He left Reach in 2020 and signed with Essential Sound, releasing his fourth studio album, His Glory Alone.

Biography

Early life 

Kevin Elijah Burgess was born in St. Petersburg, Florida, on July 21, 1988,  into a military family. Shortly after his birth his parents moved to Southern Illinois where he was raised for eight years. When he was 8 years old, his parents divorced and he moved back with his mother to the south-side of St. Petersburg, which according to Burgess is "probably one of the worst areas in the state." He did well in school and at age 15 was offered an opportunity to pursue college through a program called St. Petersburg Collegiate High School. But despite this opportunity, he struggled with extreme depression and experimented with various drugs to try to relieve it. He began struggling at school due to his problems with his personal life, and even contemplated suicide.

Formation of HGA 

After high school, Burgess enrolled in Bible college and befriended a group of Christian rappers and together they formed a hip hop group called HGA, short for His Glory Alone. HGA eventually caught the interest of Lecrae, Ben Washer, and DJ Official, and were featured with Tedashii on the track "Go" from DJ Official's album Entermission. Burgess was invited onto the "Acquire the Fire" tour by Lecrae, and was asked to join the Reach Records team just a few months later.

Signing with Reach Records 

Burgess signed with Reach Records in 2010, and appeared that year on the album Rehab by Lecrae. His mixtape Who is KB? followed a year later, as did appearances with PRo and Tedashii. Who is KB? garnered 30,000 downloads by the following year. His first single, "Hello", featured Suzy Rock and was released in October 2011. In January 2012, a second single, "Zone Out" featuring Chris Lee Cobbins, was released. Burgess then made an appearance with Andy Mineo on the Trip Lee album The Good Life. A third single by Burgess, "Go Off", featured Tedashii and Andy Mineo, and was released in June. The following month, his debut album Weight & Glory was released.

On May 30, 2013, Reach announced a four-part project entitled "1st & 16th". This project would consist of Burgess releasing a new song every first and sixteenth of June and July. On June 1, Part 1, HCB Freestyle was released. The songs Ride and Be All Right were also part of the 1st and 16th project.

On February 10, 2014, KB announced his new project, an EP entitled 100, which was released on March 4, 2014. Burgess appeared in Family Force 5 music video for the song "BZRK", released on May 23, 2014, on which Burgess is a featured artist.

On February 3, 2015, KB took to social media to reveal his second studio album, Tomorrow We Live, along with the cover and release date. It was scheduled to be released on April 21, 2015. The first single off the album "Sideways" featuring Lecrae was released on February 23, 2015. The second single "Crowns & Thorns (Oceans)" was released on March 10, 2015.

On October 20, 2017, KB released his third studio album Today We Rebel. The first single off the album "Tempo" was released a year prior to the album's release date. The second single off the album "Monster" featuring Aha Gazelle was released on September 15, 2017.

Signing with Essential Sound 
In 2020, he announced that he would not be renewing his contract with Reach Records, and instead signed with Essential Sound, a Sony Music imprint.
KB released three singles "Armies", "10K" & "Lil Boy" for his fourth studio album "His Glory Alone".
On September 25, 2020, KB released his fourth studio album His Glory Alone.

Personal life 

Burgess is currently married to his wife with three children.

Discography

Studio albums

Collaboration albums

EPs

Mixtapes

Multimedia series

Singles

As lead artist

As featured artist

Other charted songs

Guest appearances

Music videos

As lead artist

As featured artist

References

External links 
 
 KB at Reach Records

1988 births
African-American Christians
African-American male rappers
African-American poets
American evangelicals
Living people
American performers of Christian hip hop music
Rappers from Florida
Reach Records artists
21st-century American rappers
21st-century American poets
21st-century American male musicians
21st-century African-American musicians
20th-century African-American people